Arrow in the Blue is an autobiography covering the first 26 years of Arthur Koestler's life (1905–1931). It was published in 1952 by Collins with Hamish Hamilton Ltd. and has been reprinted several times.

The book and its contents

The first edition was cloth-bound and measured 210mm x 140mm, 307 pages, including four monochrome illustrations. (No ISBN)

The book is divided into five chronological Parts: 
1905-1921
1922-1926
1926-1927
1927-1930
1930-1931

Each Part deals with a different phase in the author's life.

The book covers the period from his birth in 1905 in Budapest, the dual capital of the Austro-Hungarian Monarchy, to 1931, when he joined the Communist Party of Germany. During these first twenty-six years of his life he was, among other things, a member of a Zionist duelling fraternity at the University of Vienna, a worker on a collective farm in Palestine, a street-vendor of lemonade in Haifa, editor of a newspaper in Cairo, foreign correspondent of the biggest Continental news agency in Paris and the Middle East, science editor of a major newspaper in Berlin, and a member of the North Pole expedition of the Graf Zeppelin

The book has three main themes: the historical background, personal adventure and the psychological analysis of his own spiritual development.

References

1952 non-fiction books
Books by Arthur Koestler
Arthur Koestler
Autobiographies
Hamish Hamilton books
William Collins, Sons books